Four ships of the Royal Navy have borne the name HMS Aboukir, after Abu Qir Bay, the site of the Battle of the Nile:

 was a 74-gun third-rate ship of the line, formerly the French ship Aquilon captured  at the Battle of the Nile in 1798 and broken up in 1802.
 was a 74-gun third-rate ship of the line launched in 1807, on harbour service from 1824 and sold in 1838.
 was a 90-gun second-rate ship of the line launched in 1848.  She was refitted with screw propulsion in 1858 and was sold in 1877.
 was a  launched in 1900 and torpedoed along with two sister ships on 22 September 1914.

See also
, a British coaster built in 1920 and sunk while rescuing evacuees from the battle of Belgium in May 1940

References

Royal Navy ship names